Crane Eater is an unincorporated community in Gordon County, in the U.S. state of Georgia.

History
A post office called Crane-Eater was established in 1880, and remained in operation until being discontinued in 1906. The community was named in honor of a Cherokee chief.

References

Unincorporated communities in Gordon County, Georgia
Unincorporated communities in Georgia (U.S. state)